General (or full general to distinguish it from the lower general officer ranks) is the highest rank achievable by serving officers of the British Army.  The rank can also be held by Royal Marines officers in tri-service posts, for example, General Sir Gordon Messenger the former Vice-Chief of the Defence Staff. It ranks above lieutenant-general and, in the Army, is subordinate to the rank of field marshal, which is now only awarded as an honorary rank.  The rank of general has a NATO-code of OF-9, and is a four-star rank.  It is equivalent to a full admiral in the Royal Navy or an air chief marshal in the Royal Air Force.

Officers holding the ranks of lieutenant-general and major-general may be generically considered to be generals.

Insignia
A general's insignia is a crossed sword and baton. This appeared on its own for the now obsolete rank of brigadier-general. A major-general has a pip over this emblem; a lieutenant-general a crown instead of a pip; and a full general both a pip and a crown.  The insignia for the highest rank, that of Field Marshal, consists of crossed batons within a wreath and surmounted by a crown.

See also

British and U.S. military ranks compared
British Army Other Ranks rank insignia
British Army officer rank insignia
List of British Army full generals
List of Royal Marines full generals
List of British generals and brigadiers

References

Military ranks of the British Army
Military ranks of the Royal Marines